Andrew Pinnock (born March 12, 1980) is a former American football fullback. He was drafted by the San Diego Chargers in the seventh round of the 2003 NFL Draft. He played college football at South Carolina.

Pinnock has also played for the Denver Broncos.

Early years
Pinnock attended Bloomfield High School in Bloomfield, Connecticut and was a letterman in football. As a senior, he was named the 1998 Mr. Football for the state of Connecticut, and also won All-State and All-District honors. 1998. While there, he was a teammate of the Indianapolis Colts Defensive End, Dwight Freeney.

College career
Pinnock played college football at the University of South Carolina for legendary Coach Lou Holtz where he was a standout Running Back/Fullback from 1999-2003.

Professional career

San Diego Chargers
Pinnock was drafted by the San Diego Chargers in the seventh round (229th overall) of the 2003 NFL Draft. He then served as a special team player and backup to Pro Bowler Lorenzo Neal. He was released on September 1, 2008.

Denver Broncos
Pinnock was signed by the Denver Broncos on November 26, 2008. He was released on April 29, 2009.

External links
Just Sports Stats
Denver Broncos bio
United Football League bio

1980 births
Living people
Players of American football from Connecticut
American football fullbacks
South Carolina Gamecocks football players
San Diego Chargers players
Denver Broncos players
Florida Tuskers players
Bloomfield High School (Connecticut) alumni